The 2004 Australian Carrera Cup Championship was a CAMS sanctioned motor racing competition open to Porsche 911 GT3 Cup cars. The championship, which was the second Australian Carrera Cup Championship, was contested over a nine round series and was administered by CupCar Australia Pty Ltd. Alex Davison won the title from Jim Richards and Fabian Coulthard.

Calendar
The championship was contested over a nine round series with three races per round.

Points system
Points were awarded in each race as follows:

Results

Race 2 of Round 5 at Queensland Raceway was cancelled following a crash on the first lap of the race.

Additional awards
 TAG Heuer Carrera Challenge - For Drivers 35 years or over in a 2003 Porsche 911 GT3 Cup Car  - Dean Grant
 Michelin Porsche Driver to Europe - For Drivers under 30 who haven't driven in a European Porsche series - Fabian Coulthard
 Michelin Rookie of the Year - For Drivers in their first Porsche racing series - Fabian Coulthard
 Fuchs Hard Charger - For the Driver who passes the most cars in Carrera Cup races - Tony Quinn
 Highest placed New Zealand based driver - Paul Pedersen

References

Australian Carrera Cup Championship seasons
Carrera Cup Championship